, there are 124 state parks in the U.S. state of Pennsylvania. The Pennsylvania Bureau of State Parks, a division of the Pennsylvania Department of Conservation and Natural Resources (DCNR), is the governing body for all these parks, and directly operates 116 of them. The remaining parks are operated in cooperation with other public and private organizations.

The first Pennsylvania state park, at Valley Forge, opened in 1893 and was given to the National Park Service (NPS) for America's bicentennial in 1976. There are a total of seventeen former Pennsylvania state parks: four former parks have been transferred to the NPS, four to the Pennsylvania Historical Museum Commission, two to the U.S. Army Corps of Engineers, one to both the Corps and the Pennsylvania Game Commission, five to the Pennsylvania Bureau of Forestry, and one has ceased to exist. Nine current and two former state parks have had major name changes or have been known under alternate names.

The list gives an overview of Pennsylvania state parks and a brief history of their development since the first park opened in 1893. According to Dan Cupper (1993), "Pennsylvania is the thirty-third largest state, but only Alaska and California have more park land".

Overview
There are state parks in 62 of Pennsylvania's 67 counties, which nearly reaches Pennsylvania's goal of having a state park within 25 miles (40 km) of every resident in the Commonwealth. Eleven parks do not have "State Park" in their name. Three are "Conservation Areas": Boyd Big Tree Preserve, Joseph E. Ibberson, and Varden; four are "Environmental Education Centers": Jacobsburg, Jennings, Kings Gap (also a "Training Center") and Nolde Forest; White Clay Creek is a "Preserve"; Norristown is a "Farm Park"; and Big Spring is a "State Forest Picnic Area".

Seven parks are undeveloped with no facilities: Allegheny Islands, Benjamin Rush, Bucktail, Erie Bluffs, Prompton, Swatara, and Varden; the last four of these are in the process of being developed. Five state parks are small picnic areas: Laurel Summit, Patterson, Prouty Place, Sand Bridge, and Upper Pine Bottom. Five state parks have major U.S. Army Corps of Engineers dams and/or lakes: Bald Eagle, Beltzville, Elk, Kettle Creek, and Sinnemahoning. Three former parks now belong, at least partly, to the U.S. Army Corps of Engineers. Seven parks preserve the industrial past: Canoe Creek is the site of a former lime kiln, and Caledonia, French Creek, Greenwood Furnace, Kings Gap, Mont Alto, and Pine Grove Furnace (plus one former park) are all former iron furnace sites. Eight current parks and one former park contain at least part of eight different National Natural Landmarks.

Admission to all Pennsylvania state parks is free, although there are fees charged for use of cabins, marinas, etc. Pennsylvania's state parks offer "over 7,000 family campsites, 286 cabins, nearly 30,000 picnic tables, 56 major recreational lakes, 10 marinas, 61 beaches for swimming, 17 swimming pools" and over 1,000 miles (1,600 km) of trails.

History
Pennsylvania's first state park was Valley Forge State Park, purchased by the Commonwealth on May 30, 1893 to preserve Valley Forge. It was transferred to the National Park Service (NPS) on the Bicentennial of the United States, July 4, 1976. Many state parks still preserve history: as of 2012, forty-two Pennsylvania state park sites are on the National Register of Historic Places, including two National Historic Landmarks (Delaware Canal and Point), twenty-eight Civilian Conservation Corps sites in nineteen parks, and twelve other parks' historic sites and districts. Eight of the former state parks were also chiefly historic.

In addition to preserving historic sites, Pennsylvania also sought to preserve natural beauty and offer opportunities for recreation in its state parks. In 1902 Mont Alto State Forest Park was the second park established, a year after the state "Bureau of Forestry" was set up to purchase, preserve, and restore Pennsylvania's forests, which had been ravaged by lumbering, charcoal production, and wild fires. Parks were added sporadically until the 1930s, some mere camping and picnic areas in state forests, while others preserved unique sites. The 1930s saw a great expansion of parks and their facilities under Governor Gifford Pinchot, who cooperated with President Franklin Roosevelt, despite their being of different political parties. The Civilian Conservation Corps (CCC) established 113 CCC camps in Pennsylvania (second only to California). Using CCC and Works Progress Administration (WPA) labor, the NPS built five Recreation Demonstration Areas, which became Pennsylvania state parks in 1945 and 1946: Blue Knob, French Creek, Hickory Run, Laurel Hill, and Raccoon Creek. The CCC also "fought forest fires, planted trees, built roads, buildings, picnic areas, swimming areas, campgrounds and created many state parks".

In 1956, there were forty-four state parks in Pennsylvania, mostly in rural areas. This was thanks largely to the efforts of Maurice K. Goddard, who served as director of the precursors to the DCNR for twenty-four years under six administrations. The number of visitors to parks more than tripled in this time and two voter approved bond issues (Projects 70 and 500) raised millions of dollars for park expansions and improvements. All this expansion was not without costs and by 1988 there was an estimated $90 million in deferred maintenance. In 1993, as the park system celebrated its one-hundredth anniversary, new tax and bond revenues were earmarked for the parks. Since 2000, parks are being improved through the state's Growing Greener and Growing Greener II and bond programs.

Current parks

Other names of current parks
The following are significantly different former or alternate names for nine current Pennsylvania state parks. Note that many parks were originally "State Forest Parks" or were state public camping or picnic areas in Pennsylvania state forests. In modern times, some "State Parks" have become "Environmental Education Centers", while other parks have dropped one word from their name ("Cherry Springs Drive" is now Cherry Springs, "Codorus Creek" is now Codorus, "Kooser Lake" is now Kooser, "Laurel Hill Summit" is now Laurel Summit, and "Promised Land Lake" is now Promised Land). Such minor name changes are not included in this table.

{|style="margin: 1em auto 1em auto"

|}

Former parks
The following eighteen were once Pennsylvania state parks, but have been transferred to federal (National Park Service, U.S. Army Corps of Engineers) or state (Pennsylvania Historical and Museum Commission, Pennsylvania Game Commission, Pennsylvania Bureau of Forestry) agencies, or ceased to exist.

Other names of former parks
The following are significantly different former or alternate names for two former Pennsylvania state parks. One former park dropped one word from its name ("Colerain Forge" became "Colerain" sometime between 1924 and 1937). Such minor name changes are not included in this table.

See also

List of Pennsylvania state forests
Pennsylvania Fish and Boat Commission
Pennsylvania Scenic Rivers

Notes

a. As of 2012, three Pennsylvania state parks are also the site of ski areas run by private contractors: Big Pocono (Ski Camelback), Blue Knob (Ski Blue Knob), and Denton Hill (Ski Denton). (Two other state parks had commercial ski operations in the past Laurel Mountain (from 1939 to 2005) and Black Moshannon (from 1965 to 1982).) Two parks are operated by other governmental bodies: Hillman (managed for hunting by the Pennsylvania Game Commission) and Norristown Farm (operated by the Montgomery County Department of Parks). Three parks are operated by other organizations: Susquehanna (operated by the Williamsport/Lycoming Chamber of Commerce), Prompton (operated by non-profit "Friends of Prompton"), and Salt Springs (operated by non-profit "Friends of Salt Springs").
b.  The Pennsylvania counties without state parks as of 2023 are: Armstrong, Juniata, Lehigh, Montour, and Snyder counties. Two of these counties are sites of former state parks: Crooked Creek in Armstrong County, and Snyder-Middleswarth in Snyder County.
c.  The goal of having a state park within 25 miles (40 km) of every resident was set by Maurice K. Goddard (Secretary of the Pennsylvania Department of Forests and Waters, and then of the Department of Environmental Resources from 1955 to 1979).
d.  The seven National Natural Landmarks at least partly within current state parks (with the park name in parentheses, if different) are: Cook Forest, Ferncliff Peninsula (Ohiopyle), the Glens Natural Area (Ricketts Glen), Hickory Run Boulder Field (Hickory Run), McConnells Mill, the Pine Creek Gorge (includes Colton Point and Leonard Harrison), and Presque Isle. One National Natural Landmark, Snyder Middleswarth Natural Area, is a former state park.
e.  The date of establishment for many Pennsylvania state parks is not always clear, especially for parks developed from state forest property. As an example, consider Upper Pine Bottom, which, as of 2012, is a picnic area surrounded by Tiadaghton State Forest. These state forest lands were acquired by the state by the early 1900s, the site was "Upper Pine Bottom Class B Public Campground" by 1924, the CCC built a pavilion there in 1936 (which is no longer extant), but it was not officially transferred from the Bureau of Forests to State Parks until 1962.
f.  This park was one of twenty-five chosen by the Pennsylvania Bureau of Parks for its "25 Must-See Pennsylvania State Parks" list.
g.  This park has one or more historic sites or districts on the National Register of Historic Places.
h.  There have been a considerable number of changes in Pennsylvania's categorization of its state parks and other protected areas over the years, so that what can be called a former state park is not always clear. This can be seen by comparing the following three lists from 1923, 1924, and 1937. In 1923, the Pennsylvania Department of Forests and Waters listed seven "State Forest Parks": Caledonia, Childs (now part of Delaware Water Gap National Recreation Area), Hairy John's (now a picnic area in Bald Eagle State Forest), James Buchanan, Leonard Harrison, Mont Alto, and Valhalla (now Ole Bull). Note this does not include Snyder-Middleswarth State Forest Park, established in 1921. One year later the state listed twenty-six public campgrounds in state forests, which included three of the previous year's state forest parks, plus twelve sites that later became state parks. The ten Class A Public Campgrounds (with space for cars and tents, on main highways) were: Adams Falls (now Linn Run), Big Spring, Caledonia, Childs, Colerain Forge, Darling Run, Laurel Run Park, Ole Bull, Promised Land, and Tea Springs. The sixteen Class B Public Campgrounds (lean-to shelter, on secondary roads) were: Baldwin, Bear Valley, Cherry Springs Drive, Clear Creek, Donnelly, Joyce Kilmer, Kansas, Kooser, Laurel Hill Summit (now Laurel Summit), Laurel Lake Park, Locusts, McCall's Dam, Ravensburg, Sizerville, Sulphur Springs, and Upper Pine Bottom. In 1937, the state published a brochure listing the following forty-nine protected areas: six State Parks (Caledonia, Childs, Cook Forest, Presque Isle, Pymatuning, and Ralph Stover); eight State Monuments (Bushy Run, Conrad Weiser, Drake Well, Fort Necessity, Fort Washington, James Buchanan, Valley Forge, and Washington Crossing); ten Forest Recreational Reserves (Clear Creek, Colton Point, Cowans Gap, Kooser Lake, Parker Dam, Pecks Pond, Promised Land Lake, Snow Hill, Whipple Dam, Whirl's End); sixteen Wayside Areas (Big Spring, Black Moshannon, Cherry Spring, Colerain, Greenwood Furnace, Halfway (now R.B. Winter), Joyce Kilmer, Kettle Creek, Mont Alto, Pine Grove Furnace, Reeds Gap, S.B. Elliott, Sideling Hill, Sizerville, and Tea Spring); seven Forest Monuments (Alan Seeger, Bear Meadows, Ole Bull, Detweiler Run, McConnell Narrows, Mount Logan, and Snyder-Middleswarth); and three State Forest Lookouts (Leonard Harrison, Martins Hill, and Mount Riansares). Only twelve of the twenty-six public campgrounds from 1924 are on the 1937 list. Of the forty-nine areas on the 1937 list, twenty-eight are state parks as of 2012, while nine are former state parks, and twelve are in state forests (eight of these still retain their names as state forest picnic, natural or wild areas).

References

External links

Official Pennsylvania DCNR Welcome to Pennsylvania State Parks page

 
Pennsylvania state parks
State parks